Scandal, also known as Bí Mật Thảm Đỏ, is a 2012 Vietnamese horror film directed by Victor Vu,  produced by Galaxy Studio and Saiga Films, in association with PS Vietnam, Kantana Post and Vietcom. Scandal was released in Vietnam on October 12, 2012, immediately becoming a critical and box office success.

Plot 
Two actresses compete with each other for roles, allowing ambition and personal jealousy to influence their judgment, resulting in terrifying consequences.

Cast 
 Van Trang as Y Linh
 Maya as Tra My
 Minh Thuan as Thien
 Khuong Ngoc as Le Hung
 Lan Phuong as Huong
 Duong Hoang Anh as Hoang Kiet
 Duc Thinh as Dai
 Quyen Loc as Vinh
 Jayvee Mai The Hiep as Tra My's manager
 Duong Khac Linh as Musician Duong Khac Linh
 Hong Sap as Witch doctor
 Quach Huu Loc as Journalist
 Huu Tien as Theatre director

References

External links 
 Scandal at the Internet Movie Database
 "Scandal" của Victor Vũ thu về 25 tỷ đồng sau 3 tuần ra rạp. 
 “Scandal” bóc trần hậu trường showbiz Việt.
 Phim "Scandal": Hé lộ thế giới ngầm showbiz Việt.
 Watch Trailer.

2012 films
Vietnamese horror thriller films
Films directed by Victor Vu
Vietnamese-language films
2012 horror films
2012 horror thriller films